Božo is a South Slavic masculine given name. Notable people with the name include:

Božo Bakota (1950–2015), Croatian footballer
Božo Biškupić (born 1938), Croatian politician and lawyer
Božo Broketa (1922–1985), Yugoslavian football (soccer) player
Božo Đumić (born 1992), Serbian professional basketball player
Božo Đurković (born 1972), retired Serbian football player
Božo Janković (1951–1993), Bosnian Serb football player
Božo Koprivica, essayist, dramatic adviser and literary critic from Montenegro of Yugoslavian ethnicity
Božo Kos (1931–2009), Slovene illustrator, caricaturist and comics artist
Božo Kovačević (footballer) (born 1979), Austrian footballer of Serbian descent
Božo Kovačević (politician) (born 1955), the Ambassador Extraordinary and Plenipotentiary of the Republic of Croatia to the Russian Federation from 2004 to 2009
Božo Ljubić (born 1949), Croat politician of Bosnia and Herzegovina
Božo Milić (born 1981), Montenegrin professional footballer
Božo Nikolić (1946–2010), Croat politician from Montenegro representing the Croatian Civic Initiative
Božo Petek, the author of two books on model aircraft building published in Slovene in 1946 and 1953
Božo Petrov (born 1979), Croatian politician and psychiatrist who currently serves as mayor of Metković
Božo Škerlj (1908–1961), Slovene anthropologist, author of eleven books and over 200 scientific articles
Božo Skoko (born 1976), associate professor of public relations at the Faculty of Political Science, University of Zagreb
Božo Starčević (born 1988), male Greco-Roman wrestler from Croatia
Božo Vrećo (born 1983), Bosnian musician
Božo Vuletić (born 1958), won an Olympic gold medal as a member of the Yugoslav water polo team at the 1984 Olympics

See also
Božović
Bozo (disambiguation)
Bonzo (disambiguation)
Bozok (disambiguation)
Bozoó

Croatian masculine given names
Serbian masculine given names
Slovene masculine given names